In old Korean society, a Jumak was a kind of tavern or inn that served alcoholic beverages and food and also provided lodging to travellers. It was also called jusa, juga, or jupo. While it is unknown when jumak first came into existence, historical documents show that a kisaeng (female entertainer), Cheongwan (天官), operated one. According to Samguk Yusa, a general of the Silla Kingdom, Kim Yu-sin, frequented the place when he was young. Other sources assume jumak first appeared in 1097 during King Sukjong's reign in the Goryeo Dynasty.

References

External links 

History of Korea
Types of drinking establishment